Monaco participated in the 2010 Summer Youth Olympics in Singapore.

The Monaco squad consisted of 4 athletes competing in 3 sports: aquatics (diving, swimming), sailing and taekwondo.

Diving

Girls

Sailing

One Person Dinghy

Swimming

Taekwondo

References

External links
Competitors List: Monaco

2010 in Monégasque sport
Nations at the 2010 Summer Youth Olympics
Monaco at the Youth Olympics